Spathoglottis plicata, commonly known as the Philippine ground orchid, or large purple orchid is an evergreen, terrestrial plant with crowded pseudobulbs, three or four large, pleated leaves and up to forty resupinate, pink to purple flowers. It is found from tropical and subtropical Asia to Australia and the western Pacific including Tonga and Samoa.

Description
Spathoglottis plicata is an evergreen, terrestrial herb which forms tall clumps. The petals are about the same length as the sepals but significantly wider. The labellum is 'T"-shaped, a similar size to the dorsal sepal and has three lobes with the side lobes close to vertical. At the tip of the column there is a cap, under which masses of yellow pollen grains can be seen.

Flowering occurs from September to April in Australia and in most months in China and New Guinea. After the flower is fertilized, the seeds take about six weeks to develop. When ripe, the capsule splits open and thousands of tiny seeds are carried away by wind.

Taxonomy and naming
Spathoglottis plicata was first formally described in 1825 by Carl Ludwig Blume who published the description in Bijdragen tot de flora van Nederlandsch Indië. The specific epithet (plicata) is a Latin word meaning "folded".

Distribution and habitat
The large purple orchid is found in Taiwan, southern India, Indonesia, Japan, Malaysia, New Guinea, the Philippines, Sri Lanka, Thailand, Vietnam, Australia, Tonga and Samoa. In Australia it occurs from Cooktown to the Jardine River on Cape York Peninsula. It grows in seasonally inundated and other moist areas, in sunny areas near swamps, seepages, and small streams. In Australia it flowers from September to April.

Conservation
Spathoglottis plicata was previously listed as "vulnerable" under the Environment Protection and Biodiversity Conservation Act 1999 but was delisted in 2010.

Use in horticulture
Spathoglottis plicata and its varieties have been cultivated and selected. The typical one has a bright purple flower. Some of them have mauve or pale mauve flowers. The rare pure white form is called ‘Penang White’. Due to its hardiness and fast growth, Spathoglottis plicata is cultivated and used in hybridizing with other mountain Spathoglottis that are difficult to grown in lowland to produce more interesting varieties. The first Spathoglottis hybrid was produced in 1932 by Richard Eric Holttum who crossed S. plicata with S. aurea and gave it the name Spathoglottis 'Primrose'. ‘Dwarf Legion’ is a hybrid of 'Primrose' and S. tomentosa, a dwarf form that produces many colours of flower, from pink to yellow, and pure cream.
Spathoglottis plicata needs to be grown in well-drained, well-aerated soil with the upper part of the ‘bulb’ above the ground level. Dilute manure water applied frequently is recommended.

Tissue culture
Micropropagation of Spathoglottis plicata Blume. and artificial seed production by alginate-encapsulation of PLBs was reported in 2017.

References

External links

plicata
Plants described in 1825
Terrestrial orchids
Orchids of the Philippines
Orchids of Queensland
Orchids of the United States
Flora of Hawaii
Flora of Tonga
Flora of Samoa